Summer Heat may refer to:

 Summer Heat (1968 film), a Hong Kong film directed by Kō Nakahira
 Summer Heat (1987 film), an American film directed by Michie Gleason
 Summer Heat (2006 film), a Filipino film directed by Brillante Mendoza
 Summer Heat (2008 film), a Dutch film directed by Monique van de Ven
 Summer Heat (TV series), a 2004 Hong Kong TV series
 Prom Queen: Summer Heat, 2007 American mini-web series
 Summer Heat Beach Volleyball, 2003 beach volleyball video game
 Heat wave, prolonged period of hot summer weather